Buštranje is a village located in the municipality of Preševo, Serbia. According to the 2002 census, the village had a population of 872 people. Of these, 682 (78,21 %) were ethnic Albanians, 186 (21,33 %) were Serbs and 2 (0,22 %) others.

References

Populated places in Pčinja District
Albanian communities in Serbia